Barfi, barfee, borfi or burfi is a dense milk-based sweet from the Indian subcontinent. The name comes from the Hindustani (originally Persian) word barf, which means snow. Common types of barfi include besan barfi (made with gram flour), kaju barfi (made with cashews), pista barfi (made with ground pistachios), and sing barfi (made with peanuts). 

Barfi is served year round in the Indian subcontinent. It is especially consumed during holidays such as Diwali and Eid and at weddings.

Gallery

See also
 Tablet (confectionery)
 Fudge
 Milkybar
 Nankhatai

References

Notes

Indian desserts
Indian confectionery
Nepalese cuisine
Bengali desserts
Bangladeshi desserts
Pakistani desserts
Fijian desserts
Milk dishes
Trinidad and Tobago cuisine